Andrew Stephen Murray (born 30 June 1956) is an English professional golfer.

Murray was born in Manchester. He turned professional in 1972 and played on the European Tour from 1979 to 1995. He retired from tournament golf after suffering from spondylitis for many years. He recorded his only win on the European Tour at the 1989 Panasonic European Open and finished the 1989 season at a career-best 28th on the Order of Merit. In 1994 he was joint runner-up in the Turespana Open De Canaria.

Murray worked as a commentator and analyst for the BBC. After turning 50, he combined that work with a return to tournament golf on the European Senior Tour.

Murray's son Tom plays on the European Tour and the Challenge Tour.

Professional wins

European Tour wins (1)

Other wins (4)
1987 Trinidad and Tobago Open
1988 Trinidad and Tobago Open
1989 Johnnie Walker International (Tobago)
1990 BWIA International Open (Tobago)

Results in major championships

Note: Murray only played in The Open Championship.

CUT = missed the half-way cut

References

External links

English male golfers
European Tour golfers
European Senior Tour golfers
Sportspeople from Manchester
People from Lymm
1956 births
Living people